Fiona Lea Krautil (born 20 February 1956) is an Australian specialist in inclusion, diversity and equal opportunity in the workplace.

Biography 
From 1999 to 2004 Krautil was director of the Equal Opportunity for Women in the Workplace Agency (EOWA), an Australian federal government agency. During her tenure, she established the Women in Leadership Census, the EOWA Business Achievement Awards and the EOWA Employer of Choice Citation. She has previously held positions in workforce diversity and equal employment opportunities at the University of Sydney, Australia & New Zealand Banking Group, Esso Australia and Westpac.

Publications 

Chief Executives Unplugged: Business Leaders Get Real about Women in the Workplace (with Josephine Brouard and Lisa Annese, New Frontier, 2004)
Diversity Unplugged: How Leading CEOs Champion Workplace Inclusion (Diversity Knowhow, 2014)

References

External links

 

Living people
1956 births
Australian women's rights activists
Place of birth missing (living people)